The Below list is about the area of largest cities in India. The cities are ranked by the area governed by local political bodies such as Municipality or Municipal Corporation For the list of largest metropolitan areas in India, see List of metropolitan areas in India.

Greater Jaipur and Heritage Jaipur become two separate municipal corporations so this list is not included.

This list is only for the area within a one municipal corporation, which has an area of more than 400 km2.

See also 
List of cities in India by population

References 

Area
India
smfs
f

sl
s
s
sf[fl;l

sf